Mikhail Petrovich Zhirnov (born 8 November 1994) is a Russian competitive ice dancer. With former partner Daria Morozova, he is the 2014 JGP Slovenia champion.

Personal life 
Mikhail Petrovich Zhirnov was born 8 November 1994 in Zheleznodorozhny, Moscow Oblast.

Career 
Zhirnov started skating in 1999.

Partnership with Morozova 
Zhirnov began competing with Daria Morozova in the 2008–09 season. The two were coached by Svetlana Liapina before they switched to Alexander Svinin and Irina Zhuk. 

Representing Russia, Morozova/Zhirnov made their junior international debut in November 2010 at the NRW Trophy. In September 2011, they placed fifth at their first ISU Junior Grand Prix (JGP) assignment, in Riga, Latvia. In the 2012–13 JGP season, they ranked fourth in Lake Placid, New York before winning bronze in Chemnitz, Germany. They finished fourth at the 2013 Russian Junior Championships. 

Morozova/Zhirnov took bronze at both of their 2013–14 JGP events, in Minsk, Belarus and Tallinn, Estonia, and came in sixth at the 2014 Russian Junior Championships.

Their first assignment of the 2014–15 JGP series took place in Ljubljana, Slovenia. Placing first in the short dance and third in the free dance, they won the gold medal by a margin of 0.24 over Canada's Brianna Delmaestro / Timothy Lum. They placed fourth at the JGP in Zagreb, Croatia and qualified for the ISU Junior Grand Prix Final, where they finished sixth. After withdrawing from the 2015 Russian Junior Championships, Morozova/Zhirnov ended their partnership.

Later career 
In the 2015–16 season, Zhirnov began competing with Varvara Oglobina for Azerbaijan.

Programs 
With Morozova

Competitive highlights 
CS: Challenger Series; JGP: Junior Grand Prix

With Oglobina for Azerbaijan

With Morozova for Russia

References

External links 

 

1994 births
Living people
People from Balashikha
Russian male ice dancers